Monagallaku Monagadu is a 1966 Indian Telugu-language action thriller film directed by S. D. Lal and produced by Rama Sundaram. It is a remake of the Hindi film Ustadon Ke Ustad (1963) and its Tamil version Vallavanukku Vallavan (1965). The film stars S. V. Ranga Rao, Haranath, Prabhakara Reddy, Raavi Kondala Rao, Krishna Kumari and G. Rathna. It was released on 14 January 1966, and became a commercial success.

Plot 

Ramesh, an engineer, impresses Madhava Rao, a businessman, with his plan to build a factory. Madhava Rao's daughter Geetha falls in love with Ramesh. Partners in crime Bhujangam and Mala loot a bank. With some of the looted money, Mala travels in a bus in which Ramesh also happens to be seated. Their suitcases get interchanged, and Ramesh, now suspected of committing the bank robbery, is arrested. To avoid his own arrest, the actual culprit, Bhujangam hires Kathula Rathaiah, an assassin, to kill Ramesh. Geetha had earlier saved Rathaiah, who has since considered her his sister. After learning of her love for Ramesh, he promises to help Ramesh to clear his name. After a few disguises by both Ramesh and Rathaiah and many more incidents, Bhujangam and Mala are brought to justice.

Cast 

 S. V. Ranga Rao as Kathula Rathaiah
 Haranath as Ramesh
 Prabhakar Reddy as Bhujangam
 Raavi Kondala Rao as Madhava Rao
 Krishna Kumari as Geetha
 G. Rathna as Mala
 Savitri as a qawwali dancer
Balayya
Chalam

Production 
After the commercial success of Vallavanukku Vallavan, the Tamil remake of the Hindi film Ustadon Ke Ustad (1963), its producer Rama Sundaram decided to remake the film in Telugu under the same banner, Modern Theatres. S. D. Lal was signed on to direct the remake, titled Monagallaku Monagadu, and his brother S. S. Lal was signed as cinematographer, while Pinisetty wrote the dialogues. L. Balu worked as editor. Savitri, who made a guest appearance as a qawwali dancer in Vallavanukku Vallavan, was chosen to reprise the role in Monagallaku Monagadu.

Soundtrack 
The soundtrack was composed by Vedha. The song "Nenunnadi Neelone" is based on "Sau Baar Janam Lenge" from Ustadon Ke Ustad.

Release and reception 
Monagallaku Monagadu was released on 14 January 1966, and became a commercial success.

References

External links 
 

1960s action thriller films
1960s Telugu-language films
Films about organised crime in India
Indian action thriller films
Indian black-and-white films
Telugu remakes of Hindi films
Films directed by S. D. Lal